Kipling is a brand selling handbags, backpacks, totes, luggage and other accessories. It was founded in 1987 in Antwerp, Belgium. Kipling has been a part of VF Corporation since 2004. Today, Kipling has 250 employees across its corporate offices in Antwerp, New Jersey, São Paulo, and Hong Kong. Kipling bags are sold in more than 80 countries internationally and can be found in more than 7,500 stores.

History
Kipling was founded in 1987 in Antwerp by designer Xavier Kegels (who also founded Hedgren) and Paul Van De Velde, who were joined by a third partner, Vincent Haverbeke. The name was inspired by Rudyard Kipling who wrote the children’s story The Jungle Book.

In June 2004, VF Corporation, an American worldwide apparel and footwear company, acquired Kipling. Kipling became part of VF's "sportswear" range.

Timeline
1986: The original founders of Kipling decide to create a new bags company in Antwerp, Belgium
 1989: Kipling goes to North America and Japan
 1993: Kipling goes to Central America
 2004: Kipling joins the portfolio of VF

Brand and products

Kipling is known for its casual-styled accessories, bags, backpacks and luggage. Besides its iconic crinkle nylon fabric, the brand produces bags in many other materials. Its offering ranges from pouches, wallets and small key hangers to handbags, cross-bodies, totes, backpacks, weekenders and luggage. The brand is also popular for its bright, heavy-duty travel pieces, as well as for its schoolbags among kids.

Kipling is known for their signature furry monkey keychain.

Collaborations
 1991 - Perrier
 1995 - Ford
 2007 - Fergie
 2008 - Gloria Coelho
 2009 - Cathy Pill
 2009 - Girls from Omsk
 2010 - El Degado Buil
 2010 - Peter Pilotto
 2011 - JCDC 
 2013 - Helena Christensen
 2014 - Natalie Joos
 2015 - Eva Mouton
 2017 - Snow White and the Seven Dwarfs
 2018 - Alice in Wonderland 
 2018 - Star Wars
 2018 - Helen Lee
 2019 - Angel Chen
 2019 - Christine Lau
 2019 - Mickey Mouse
 2019 - Frozen II
 2020 - Pac-Man
 2020 - Mickey & Friends
 2020 - Keith Haring
 2022 - Woodstock
 2022 - MTV
 2022 - Anna Sui
 2022 - Pantone
 2022 - Hello Kitty

External links 
 
 VF Corporation

References 

VF Corporation
Belgian companies established in 1987
Retail companies established in 1987
Clothing brands of Belgium
Belgian brands
Antwerp
2004 mergers and acquisitions